A rocket launcher is a weapon that launches an unguided, rocket-propelled projectile.

History

The earliest rocket launchers documented in imperial China consisted of arrows modified by the attachment of a rocket motor to the shaft a few inches behind the arrowhead. The rocket was propelled by the burning of the black powder in the motor; these should not be confused with early fire arrows, which were conventional arrows carrying small tubes of black powder as an incendiary that ignited only after the arrow hit its target. The rocket launchers were constructed of wood, basketry, and bamboo tubes. The launchers divided the rockets with frames meant to keep them separated, and the launchers were capable of firing multiple rockets at once. Textual evidence and illustrations of various early rocket launchers are found in the 1510 edition of the Wujing Zongyao translated by Needham and others at Princeton University. (The original Wujing Zongyao was compiled between 1040 and 1044 and described the discovery of black powder but preceded the invention of the rocket. Partial copies of the original survived and Wujing Zongyao was republished in 1231 during the Southern Song Dynasty, including military developments since the original 1044 publication. The British scientist, sinologist, historian Joseph Needham asserts that the 1510 edition is the most reliable in its faithfulness to the original and 1231 versions, since it was printed from blocks that were re-carved directly from tracings of the edition made in 1231 AD.) The 1510 Wujing Zongyao describes the "long serpent" rocket launcher, a rocket launcher constructed of wood and carried with a wheelbarrow, and the "hundred tiger" rocket launcher, a rocket launcher made of wood and capable of firing 320 rocket arrows. The text also describes a portable rocket carrier consisting of a sling and a bamboo tube.

Rocket launchers known as "wasp nest" launchers were used by the Ming dynasty in 1380 and in 1400 by Li Jinglong against Zhu Di.

Rockets were introduced to the West during the Napoleonic Wars; the Congreve rocket was a British weapon devised by Sir William Congreve in 1804 after experiencing Indian rockets at the Siege of Seringapatam (1799). Congreve rockets were launched from an iron trough about 18 inches (45 centimetres) in length, called a chamber. These chambers could be fixed to the ground for horizontal launching, secured to a folding copper tripod for high angle fire or mounted on frames on carts or the decks of warships.

The collection of the royal armies includes man portable rocket launchers that appear (based on lock designs) to date from the two decades after 1820. These don’t appear to have entered general use and no surviving documentation on them has been found.

During the American Civil War, both the Union and the Confederate Military experimented upon and produced rocket launchers. Confederate forces used Congreve rockets in limited uses due to its inaccuracies, while the Union forces used Hale patent rocket launcher which fired seven to ten inch rockets with fin stabilizers at a range of 2000 yards.

World War II

Pre-war research programmes into military rocket technology by many of the major powers led to the introduction of a number of rocket artillery systems with fixed or mobile launchers, often capable of firing a number of rockets in a single salvo. In the United Kingdom, solid fuel rockets were initially used in the anti-aircraft role; the 7-inch Unrotated Projectile was fired from single pedestal-mounted launchers on warships and a 3-inch version was used by shore based Z Batteries, for which multiple "projectors" were developed. Later developments of these weapons included the Land Mattress multiple launchers for surface-to-surface bombardment and the RP-3 air-to-ground rockets that were launched from rails fitted to fighter bomber aircraft. In Germany, the 15 cm Nebelwerfer 41 was an adaptation of a multiple barrelled smoke mortar for artillery rockets. The Soviets Katyusha was a self-propelled system, being mounted on trucks, tanks and even trains. The United States Army deployed the tank mounted T34 Calliope system late in the war.

Types

Shoulder-fired

The rocket launchers category includes shoulder-fired weapons, any weapon that fires a rocket-propelled projectile at a target yet is small enough to be carried by a single person and fired while held on one's shoulder. Depending on the country or region, people might use the terms "bazooka" or "RPG" as generalized terms to refer to such weapons, both of which are in fact specific types of rocket launchers. The Bazooka was an American anti-tank weapon which was in service from 1942–1957, while the RPG (most commonly the RPG-7) is a Soviet anti-tank weapon.

A smaller variation is the gyrojet, a small arms rocket launcher with ammunition slightly larger than that of a .45-caliber pistol.

Recoilless rifles are sometimes confused with rocket launchers. A recoilless rifle launches its projectile using an explosive powder charge, not a rocket engine, though some such systems have sustainer rocker motors.

Rocket pod

A rocket pod is a launcher that contains several unguided rockets held in individual tubes, designed to be used by attack aircraft or attack helicopters for close air support. In many cases, rocket pods are streamlined to reduce aerodynamic drag. The first pods were developed immediately after World War II, as an improvement over the previous arrangement of firing rockets from rails, racks or tubes fixed under the wings of aircraft. Early examples of pod-launched rockets were the US Folding-Fin Aerial Rocket and the French SNEB.

Large scale
Larger-scale devices which serve to launch rockets include the multiple rocket launcher, a type of unguided rocket artillery system.

See also
 Launch pad
 List of gun-launched missiles
 List of rocket launchers

References

Explosive weapons
 
Chinese inventions
Rockets and missiles
Rocket artillery
Rocket weapons
Weapon fixtures